Radio Astra (Ράδιο Άστρα) is a privately owned radio broadcasting station in Cyprus with island-wide coverage. It was launched by a company called Radio Stage on 7 December 1994.

Radio stations in Cyprus
Radio stations established in 1994